was a town located in Nitta District, Gunma Prefecture, Japan.

On March 28, 2005, Yabuzukahon, along with the towns of Nitta and Ojima (all from Nitta District), was merged into the expanded city of Ōta.

History

Geography

River 	
 蛇川

Place name  	
 大原	
 大久保
 薮塚
 山之神
 寄合
 六千石

Adjacent municipality 
 桐生市
 伊勢崎市
 新田郡
 新田町
 笠懸町

Infrastructure

School 
 藪塚本町小学校
 藪塚本町南小学校
 藪塚本町中学校

Library 
 藪塚本町図書館

Children's center 
 藪塚本町児童館

Police 
 太田警察署 藪塚本町交番

Health 
 藪塚本町保健センター

Posto office 
藪塚本町郵便局
 藪塚駅前郵便局

Park 
 藪塚本町中央運動公園

Dissolved municipalities of Gunma Prefecture
Ōta, Gunma